The Very Good Food Company was a plant-based meat and vegan cheese company in British Columbia, Canada. The company started in 2017 and appeared on the television show Dragon's Den in 2018. In 2018, they successfully raised $600,000 from 240 local investors through Canadian equity-crowdfunding platform FrontFundr. The plant based meats they sold were known as the Very Good Butchers while the cheeses were known as The Very Good Cheese Company.

The company was listed on the Canadian Securities Exchange (CSE). This started in June 2020 with 16.1 million shares.

The company announced on February 2, 2023 that they would be ceasing operations and would be selling off assets.[]

References

External links 
 
The Very Good Butchers website

Meat substitutes
Companies listed on the Canadian Securities Exchange
Food and drink companies established in 2017
Canadian companies established in 2017
[]<ref><ref>